Allspark may refer to:
 The Allspark, an artifact in the Transformers franchise that created the Cybertronians

 Allspark (company), formerly Hasbro Studios, an American media production and distribution company named after said object

See also 
 "All Sparks", 2005 song by British band Editors